Majareh (also Romanized as Majreh and Majarah; also known as Madgera, Madghareh, and Madzhera) is a village in Khanandabil-e Sharqi Rural District, in the Central District of Khalkhal County, Ardabil Province, Iran. At the 2006 census, its population was 1,328, in 325 families.

References 

Tageo

Towns and villages in Khalkhal County